"I Wanna Be a Hippy" is a song by English electronic group Technohead. The vocals were taken from David Peel's song "I Like Marijuana", which he sung in the movie Rude Awakening. It first appeared as the B-side to the group's Mary Jane EP, issued by Dutch hardcore techno label Mokum Records. John Peel featured the track "Mary Jane" on his show on 10 February 1995, which helped give the release recognition.

In June 1995, "I Wanna Be a Hippy" was released as the lead single from the group's first album, Headsex (1995); the single includes a remix by Dutch-American production duo Flamman & Abraxas. The song appeared on the mainstream charts later that year, peaking at number one in Austria, Flanders, Germany, and the Netherlands and reaching the top ten in several other countries. In the United Kingdom, the song peaked at number 77 during its original release, but when re-released in early 1996, it reached a new peak of number six.

In January and February 1996, Technohead performed the song live on Top of the Pops twice, although both performances had the references to marijuana censored. In September 2019, in celebration of Mokum Records' 200th release, Tellurian and Technohead released a remix of the song known as the "Panama 2019 Mix".

Background
In a 2018 interview with AT5 commemorating 25 years of Mokum Records, Flamman & Abraxas revealed that their remix of the song was meant to be a joke and for the song to get played on the radio. The duo also revealed that when the song first came out, the song was insanely popular at Amnesia, a gabber club the duo opened up in Amsterdam. It reached the point where the song was requested as often as five times a night, leading the duo to contact Technohead about remixing the song due to how frequent it was played. Additionally, they added that despite the massive worldwide chart success of the song, they received no royalties due to a swap deal they did with Technohead. They made this remix for Technohead, in exchange Technohead did a remix for them, but both duo's kept the rights to their song. DJ Dano, who also did a remix of the song that was sold alongside the Flamman & Abraxas remix, didn't get any royalties either because he also made such a swap deal with Technohead.

It was also revealed in the AT5 interview that the song led to the downfall of gabber music in general when "Gabbertje" by Hakkuhbar, also released by Mokum, was released, spurring a wave of "funny gabbers" that made commercial hardcore, which showed similarities to Flamman & Abraxas' style. Despite this, Jeff "Abraxas" Porter joked that because of the remix's success and the string of number-one hits the duo had with the Party Animals, "[They] took over Mokum like Trump took over the Republican Party."

Critical reception
British magazine Music Week gave "I Wanna Be a Hippy" two out of five, adding, "Could be a surprise hit along the lines of Rednex's Cotton Eye Joe. Relentless, speedy techno that's proving a hit across the water." James Hyman from the magazine's RM Dance Update rated it three out of five, saying, "With blatant references to getting high and smoking marijuana, this novelty gabba-fuelled hit has already been number one in Holland, Germany and Austria." Another editor, Tim Jeffery gave it five out of five, picking it as Tune of the Week. He commented, "If you get the European satellite music programmes you'll be familiar with this fabulously irreverant track because its brilliantly funny video, featuring ravers chasing a hippy, has been on heavy rotation for ages. At breakneck speed, this is pop gabba with its tongue firmly in cheek and it's been a massive hit everywhere in Europe except here. [...] Deserved to be number one in the charts, no question."

Music video
The music video for the song, which uses the Flamman & Abraxas mix, shows three gabbers, who Flamman & Abraxas knew from Amnesia, wearing Mokum Records shirts chasing after a hippy on a bike through Vondelpark in Amsterdam with inflatable hammers. The hippy eventually escapes by walking into a funhouse mirror and disappearing. The video was directed by Matthijs Van Heyningen Jr. In the aforementioned interview with AT5, MC Remsy revealed that after the song become a huge success, Flamman & Abraxas recruited him and the other gabbers featured in the video to form another group, which became the Party Animals.

Track listings
CD Maxi-single (Europe, 1995)
 "I Wanna Be a Hippy" (Flamman & Abraxas Radio Mix) – 3:17
 "I Wanna Be a Hippy" (Original Mix) – 5:03
 "I Wanna Be a Hippy" (Speedfreak Mix)	– 6:04
 "I Wanna Be a Hippy" (Zippy Mix) – 4:17
 "I Wanna Be a Hippy" (Dano No Sweat Mix) – 5:12

Charts and certifications

Weekly charts

Year-end charts

Certifications

Release history

Covers and parodies
In 1996, the Smurfs released a parody of the song called "I've Got a Little Puppy" which was included on the album The Smurfs Go Pop! The parody charted within the top 10 in the United Kingdom, peaking at number four for two weeks in September.

References

1995 debut singles
1995 songs
1996 singles
Dutch Top 40 number-one singles
Gabber songs
Number-one singles in Austria
Number-one singles in Germany
Songs about cannabis
Songs about hippies
Techno songs
Ultratop 50 Singles (Flanders) number-one singles